Writers of the Future (WOTF) is a science fiction and fantasy story contest that was established by L. Ron Hubbard in the early 1980s. A sister contest, Illustrators of the Future, presents awards for science fiction art.  Hubbard characterized the contest as a way of "giving back" to the field that had defined his professional writing life.  The contest has no entry fee and is the highest-paying contest for amateur science-fiction and fantasy writers.  Notable past winners of WOTF include Stephen Baxter, Karen Joy Fowler, James Alan Gardner, Nina Kiriki Hoffman, Jay Lake, Michael H. Payne, Patrick Rothfuss, Robert Reed, Dean Wesley Smith, Sean Williams, Dave Wolverton, Nancy Farmer, and David Zindell.

Contest rules and procedures

Writers of the Future
The Writers of the Future (WOTF) contest may be entered quarterly, and is open to authors who have no, or few, professional publications. The contest rules state that entrants cannot have had published "a novel or short novel, or more than one novelette, or more than three short stories, in any medium. Professional publication is deemed to be payment and at least 5,000 copies or 5,000 hits."  Works that are less than 3,000 words and for which payment was less 6c/word, do not count as "professional" publications.  Stories of up to 17,000 words in length can be submitted to the contest. Poems, screenplays, non-fiction, etc., are not eligible.

Manuscripts are judged with the authors' names deleted and are separated out in quarterfinal and semifinal award rounds by the Coordinating Judge (previously K. D. Wentworth, currently Dave Wolverton, and originally Algis Budrys). Eight finalists are sent to a panel of professional science fiction writers, who determine the top three awards. Prizes are $1000 (first place), $750 (second) and $500 (third).  The process is then repeated the next quarter.  At the end of the contest year, the four quarterly first place stories compete for a separate annual grand prize, the "Gold Award," which includes an additional $5000. The first, second and third-place winners and often a selection of the other finalist stories are published annually, for which the writers receive additional compensation for publication rights.  Thus, a grand prize-winning author can make over $6000 for a single story - more than many writers receive for a first novel. 

Some finalist stories not considered among the top three (in effect, the fourth or fifth placers) may be included in the annual anthology.  These are called "published finalists."  The writers are compensated for publication rights, but are not considered winners and receive no prize money, but are eligible to re-enter the contest.  Often writers will repeatedly enter the contest, quarter after quarter, until they either win or become ineligible due to publications elsewhere.

Illustrators of the Future
An artists' contest, the Illustrators of the Future (IOTF), was added in 1988.  Like the WOTF contest, the Illustrators contest is open to amateurs.  The Rules state: "The Contest is open to those who have not previously published more than three black-and-white story illustrations, or more than one process-color painting, in media distributed nationally to the general public, such as magazines or books sold at newsstands, or books sold in stores merchandising to the general public. The submitted entry shall not have been previously published in professional media as exampled above."

Entrants submit a portfolio of three pieces of artwork, which are circulated among the judges.  Up to three winners are selected every quarter, each given a prize of $500.  Unlike the Writers, the Illustrators are not ranked.  After the completion of the contest year, each of the twelve Illustration winners is assigned one of the stories from among the twelve Writer winners, and given a month to return the finished illustration.  A single grand prize, also called the Gold Award, is accompanied by a prize of $5000 - judging is based only on the final illustration, not the initial portfolio.  While the art is judged according to standard artistic considerations (composition, draftsmanship, consistency of lighting, sense of wonder, facial expressions, etc.), a key consideration during the final judging is whether or not the art would make the viewer want to read the accompanying story.  The art is also included in the annual anthology, and illustrators are additionally compensated.

Awards and workshop
No official tallies are given for the number of entrants in either contest, but it is believed that thousands enter the Writers contest every quarter, while only hundreds enter the Illustration contest.  Thus, the Illustration judges are sometimes often unable to find three deserving winners, and only pick one or two.  (This is not a problem for the Writing judges.)  Should the Illustration winners number less than twelve in a year, each illustrator is - as usual - assigned a single story to illustrate for purposes of determining who wins the Gold Award.  Returning the assigned illustration quickly does not directly correlate to winning the Gold Award, but those artists who do so are allowed the opportunity to illustrate additional stories.   

All winners and published finalists are invited to attend the annual week-long writers' and artists' workshops and Awards gala at the invitation and expense of the contest administration.  Tuxedoes and gowns are worn by the judges, administrators, and winners for the Awards gala (but members of the general public are casually attired), and various Hollywood actors are generally in attendance, in addition to prominent science fiction authors and artists.  These include the present judges in addition to a famous and generally elderly writer given a Lifetime Achievement Award.  While it is not required to attend the week-long festivities and seminars, it is thought by some that those in the running for the Gold Award may advance their cause by displaying professionalism and hard work at that time; judges for the contest, however, refute this, as the judging is done blindly in advance of the week-long pre-awards event and most judges don't arrive on site until the last day of the workshop.

Judges
Many noted writers and artists have judged WotF awards, or have won them themselves.
Notable writing judges have included: Kevin J. Anderson, Gregory Benford, Algis Budrys, Orson Scott Card, Brian Herbert, Nina Kiriki Hoffman, Anne McCaffrey, Larry Niven, Andre Norton, Frederik Pohl, Jerry Pournelle, Tim Powers, Brandon Sanderson, Robert J. Sawyer, K. D. Wentworth, and Jack Williamson. Prominent art judges have included: Ciruelo Cabral, Edd Cartier, Echo Chernik, Leo and Diane Dillon, Bob Eggleton, Will Eisner, Frank Frazetta, Frank Kelly Freas, Stephen Hickman, and Stephen Youll.

Winners
The following is a list of Grand Prize winners in each contest year. Stories by the grand prize winner, the quarterly top-three, and selected others ("published finalists"), are collected into an anthology each year. Winners and published finalists in the contest have included the writers  Stephen Baxter, Karen Joy Fowler, Carl Frederick, James Alan Gardner, Jim C. Hines, Jay Lake, David D. Levine, Syne Mitchell, Nnedi Okorafor, Michael H. Payne, Brian Plante, Robert Reed, Bruce Holland Rogers, Patrick Rothfuss, Dean Wesley Smith, Catriona Sparks, Sean Tinsley, Mary Turzillo, Sean Williams, Dave Wolverton, David Zindell, and the artists Shaun Tan and Frank Wu.

Connections to Scientology

The original sponsor of the contest was Bridge Publications, Inc., the publishing arm of the Church of Scientology. Prior to the 2004 contest, the sponsorship moved to Author Services Inc. under the trade name Galaxy Press, which was spun off from Bridge  to publish Hubbard's fiction and the contest anthologies.

The contest has also been characterized as a promotional vehicle for Hubbard himself, who returned to science fiction writing with Battlefield Earth at about the same time as he began the contest. On the covers of the annual WOTF anthologies, Hubbard's name appears "above the title", and in at least as prominent a font. The prominence of Hubbard's name and the lavish funding of the contest awards, publicity and ceremonies have led some to speculate that the contest is part of a campaign by the Church of Scientology to promote Hubbard's status in the science fiction and literary communities.

Entering or winning the contest does not require or imply endorsement or membership in the Church of Scientology, and the contest itself has been endorsed by a wide range of well-known speculative fiction writers (see Judges and Winners above) who have no relationship to Scientology.

According to Director of the Writers and Illustrators Contests Joni Labaqui, the funds to underwrite the contest—including the cash prizes, the gala awards ceremony and the weeklong pre-awards festivities—come from the Hubbard estate. The Hubbard estate is separate from the Church of Scientology and earns royalties from sales of Hubbard's books, including his fiction. Labaqui also reports that staff of Author Services Inc. is entirely made up of Scientologists.

Records with the United States Patent and Trademark Office show that the rights to the Writers of the Future name were transferred from the L. Ron Hubbard estate ("Family Trust-B") to the Church of Spiritual Technology in 1989, and under the 1993 IRS closing agreement with the Church of Scientology, the L. Ron Hubbard estate became part of the Church of Spiritual Technology, a "Scientology-related entity".

See also
 Author Services Inc.
 Bridge Publications (Scientology)

Notes

L. Ron Hubbard
Scientology organizations
Creative writing programs
W